Printing and Paper Union is the name of:

 Printing and Paper Union (Germany), former trade union in Germany
 Printing and Paper Union (Netherlands), former trade union in the Netherlands

See also
 Industrial Union of Printing and Paper, former trade union in East Germany
 Union of Printing and Paper, former trade union in Switzerland